The 1989 Men's South American Volleyball Championship, the 18th tournament, took place in 1989 in Curitiba.

Final positions

Mens South American Volleyball Championship, 1989
Men's South American Volleyball Championships
1989 in South American sport
International volleyball competitions hosted by Brazil 
1989 in Brazilian sport